Asahel Farr (October 10, 1820June 13, 1887) was an American surgeon and Wisconsin pioneer.  He was a member of the Wisconsin State Assembly and the Wisconsin State Senate, and was Mayor of Kenosha, Wisconsin, for seven years between 1859 and 1879.

Biography
Farr was born on October 10, 1820, in Waterford, Vermont. He attended the common schools and then taught school to raise money to enter Dartmouth College.  He graduated from the medical department of Dartmouth College in 1846 and commenced practice as a doctor and surgeon in St. Johnsbury, Vermont.  He moved to Peacham, Vermont, in 1847, where he married Martha Jackson Wheeler and where his father died in 1852.  He then moved to Kenosha, Wisconsin, in 1854, with his wife and son.

In addition to his work in medicine, he served on the Kenosha school board and was president of the school board from 1871 to 1874.  He was elected to his first one-year term as Mayor in 1859, then again in 1864, 1871, 1872, 1873, 1877, and 1878.  Farr was a member of the Assembly in 1873 and represented the 8th district of the Senate (at the time Kenosha and Walworth counties) from 1876 to 1877. Politically, he was a Democrat until the outbreak of the American Civil War.  At that time, he became a Republican and remained with that party for the rest of his life.

Personal life and family

Farr married Martha Jackson Wheeler of Vermont and together they had three children.  Albert and William both became doctors like their father, and Martha married Colonel James R. Nutting.  His wife died in 1878 and he remarried to Emma Marr Durfee of Waukegan, Illinois.

Farr's parents, Alpheus and Sybil Farr, appear to be cousins, both descended from George Farr, a shipbuilder who came to the colonies from England.

Electoral history

Wisconsin Assembly (1872)

| colspan="6" style="text-align:center;background-color: #e9e9e9;"| General Election, November 5, 1872

Wisconsin Senate (1875)

| colspan="6" style="text-align:center;background-color: #e9e9e9;"| General Election, November 2, 1875

References

See also
The Political Graveyard

People from Caledonia County, Vermont
Republican Party Wisconsin state senators
Republican Party members of the Wisconsin State Assembly
Mayors of Kenosha, Wisconsin
Dartmouth College alumni
1820 births
1887 deaths